Iain Sinclair (born 7 October 1976 in Scotland) is a Scottish former Scotland A international rugby union player who played for Glasgow Warriors at the Flanker position. A product of Scottish Schools U16 and U18, Sinclair went on to captain both Glasgow and Scotland at U18, U19 and U21 age group levels.

He played 6 matches for Glasgow in the Heineken Cup in 1997-98 season. Sinclair also played in the Scottish Inter-District Championship of the 1997-98 season for Glasgow against Edinburgh Rugby. Glasgow won the match 36-20.

In 1997, Sinclair captained the Scottish Silver Thistles, an undefeated Scotland Development XV which toured New Zealand.

For the 1998-99 season onwards, Sinclair played for Edinburgh Rugby winning player of the inter-district Tri Series in 1999. He played a further 10 times in the Heineken Cup for Edinburgh between 1998 and 2001.

He played for Watsonians. and Penguin International RFC.

He was a player for the Xodus Steelers, a veteran Scottish Sevens side that contested the Dubai International Veterans Rugby 10's, winning in 2012 and then managing the side in 2013 to back to back victory.

A former Managing Director at Murray Metals, Sinclair is now Executive Director, Global Energy Group.

External links 
 EPCR Profile

References 

1976 births
Living people
Scottish rugby union players
Glasgow Warriors players
Edinburgh Rugby players
Watsonians RFC players
Scotland 'A' international rugby union players
Rugby union flankers